Two members of the Presidency of the Central Committee of the League of Communists of Yugoslavia (SKJ) for the Socialist Republic of Montenegro existed from the 11th Congress in 1978 to the dissolution of the SKJ at the 14th Congress in 1990.

See also
Socialist Republic of Montenegro

Socialist Federal Republic of Yugoslavia
Politics of Montenegro